Purging disorder is an eating disorder characterized by the DSM-5 as self-induced vomiting, or misuse of laxatives, diuretics, or enemas to forcefully evacuate matter from the body. Purging disorder differs from bulimia nervosa (BN) because individuals do not consume a large amount of food before they purge.  In current diagnostic systems, purging disorder is a form of other specified feeding or eating disorder.  Research indicates that purging disorder, while not rare, is not as commonly found as anorexia nervosa or bulimia nervosa. This syndrome is associated with clinically significant levels of distress, and that it appears to be distinct from bulimia nervosa on measures of hunger and ability to control food intake. Some of the signs of purging disorder are frequent trips to the bathroom directly after a meal, frequent use of laxatives, and obsession over one's appearance and weight. Other signs include swollen cheeks, popped blood vessels in the eyes, and clear teeth which are all signs of excessive vomiting.

Purging disorder is studied far less often than anorexia nervosa and bulimia nervosa as it is not considered an independent diagnosis in the DSM-5, published in 2013. However, it has been argued that purging disorder should be considered a distinct eating disorder, separate from bulimia nervosa. Because of this, little information is known about the risk factors for purging disorder, including how gender, race, and class could contribute to the risk for purging disorder. As with most eating disorders, it is suggested that purging disorder is gender specific because of cultural forces and social pressures. These social pressures are associated with a severe preoccupation with shape and weight, this puts women and transgender individuals at the most risk for eating disorders, including purging disorder. In one study of the risk factors for purging disorder 77% of the participants who presented with symptoms of purging disorder were female. Purging disorder progressing into bulimia nervosa has been observed, while it is extremely rare for the reverse situation, bulimia nervosa progressing into purging disorder. This was observed once in a transgender patient with a severe history of bulimia nervosa but presented with symptoms of purging disorder to an eating disorder treatment facility in New Zealand.

Estimates of lifetime prevalence of purging disorder have been estimated from 1.1% to 5.3%.

Signs and symptoms 

 Recurrent purging to influence body weight or shape
 Absence of binging episode(s)
 Purge behaviors occur at least once per week for at least 3 months
 Undue influence of body shape and weight
Russell's sign

Causes

Risk Factors 

 Dieting
 Thin-ideal internalization
 Body dissatisfaction

Genetic 
The heritability of some eating disorders has been well established, but to date there are no documented family studies of purging disorder to understand the familial nature of purging disorder.

Diagnosis 
The DSM-5 is used as a reference to diagnose Purging Disorder. A patient with Purging disorder will be diagnosed with other specified feeding or eating disorder.

Complications 
Purging behaviors, specifically self-induced vomiting and laxative use are associated with the following medical complications:

 Subconjunctival hemorrhages (small bleeds in the eyes)
 Cuts or scars on the top of the hands (Russell's sign)
 Dental abnormalities such as enamel erosion
 Swelling of the parotid gland
 Mild esophagitis, heartburn, or acid reflux
 Renal (kidney) inflammation

Treatment 
Treatment for purging disorder can be multidisciplinary. One approach to treatment is cognitive behavioral therapy.

Prognosis 
Children and teenagers with purging disorder have been found to have poorer health-related quality of life than their healthy peers. A small review of 11 cases of purging disorder where death occurred found that only 5 of the 11 deaths could be contributed to the purging disorder. The remaining 6 deaths were a result of suicide.

References

External links
 Defining Purging Disorder in Practice
 

Eating disorders